The King Is Coming is the third studio album from Saving Grace. Facedown Records released the album on November 22, 2011. Saving Grace worked with Zorran Mendonsa, in the production of this album.

Critical reception

Awarding the album four and a half stars from HM Magazine, Rob Shameless states, "The Kings Is Coming is their septor(sic)." Rating the album an eight out of ten at Cross Rhythms, Graeme Crawford writes, "There are only a few downsides here." Giving the album four stars for Jesus Freak Hideout, Steven Powless describes, "with The King Is Coming, they have firmly established themselves among Facedown's best and show nothing but promise; forgive the wordplay, but this blistering, Spirit-filled band may just be their label's Saving Grace." Jeremiah Holdworth, awarding the album four stars from Indie Vision Music, states, "Songs range from amazing, to great, with a couple that fall short, including a boring instrumental ... Great music and messages equals a great album!" Rating the album an eight out of ten by The Christian Music Review Blog, Grant White writes, "They need the extra wow factor to make themselves become more known."

Track listing

Credits

Saving Grace
 Vasely Sapunov - Guitar, Vocals
 Nicholas Tautuhi - Vocals
 Shaun Anderson - Drums
 Mike Benson - Bass
 George White - Guitar 
Additional Musicians
 Carl Schwartz (First Blood) - Guest Vocals on track 8
Production
 Logan Mader - Mastering
 Zorran Mendonsa - Engineer, Guitar, Producer, Programming
 Dave Quiggle - Artwork, Layout
 Carl Schwartz - Additional Personnel

References

2011 albums
Saving Grace (band) albums
Facedown Records albums